Koti Shur (also Romanized as Kotī Shūr; also known as Gowd-e Shūrū, Kot-e Shūr, and Kūt-i-Shūr) is a village in the Javar Rural District of the Central District of Kuhbanan County, Kerman Province, Iran. Its existence was noted in the 2006 census, but its population was not reported.

References 

Populated places in Kuhbanan County